The World Championship of Chess Composition is a triennial competition for composers of   chess problems and studies. Organised in the past by FIDE via the Permanent Commission of the FIDE for Chess Compositions (PCCC), it is currently held by the World Federation for Chess Composition (WFCC). The official title is World Championship in Composing for Individuals (WCCI).

The championship is divided into eight sections:

A)  Twomovers (checkmate in two moves)
B)  Threemovers (checkmate in three moves)
C)  Moremovers (checkmate in more than three moves)
D)  Studies 
E)  Helpmates 
F)  Selfmates 
G)  Fairies (using elements of fairy chess)
H)  Retros (retrograde analysis)

Composers wishing to participate in any given section are expected to submit at most six of their compositions, published in the relevant three-year period and fulfilling the requirements of the section. The problems submitted are then evaluated by a commission of three Judges, and the best four of them count for the final result in the section. (More on rules is at the  official PCCC page.)

Three championships have been held up to 2006 for the relevant three-year periods: 1998–2000, 2001–2003 and 2004–2006. The most successful composer so far is Mikhail Marandyuk of Ukraine, who won ten gold medals and two silver medals.

Medalists

1998–2000

2001–2003

2004–2006

2007–2009

2010–2012

2013–2015

2016–2018

External links
 Composing competitions of WFCC

Composition
Chess problems